Fishers High School (FHS) is one of two high schools in Hamilton Southeastern Schools in Fishers, Indiana, United States.

History
The original Fishers High School was located at Lantern Road and 116th Street, where the current Fishers Elementary School stands, but the school was demolished in 1969 after the opening of Hamilton Southeastern High School. In 2003, the current school opened as a freshman campus but, in 2007, the school opened a second wing which allowed for grades 9–12 to occupy the building. A third wing was completed following the end of the 2015 school year as a College and Career Academy.

Due to the Covid-19 contagion, FHS converted to online learning on April 14, 2020 for the remainder of the 2019-2020 school year. The school district has announced that it will resume on-site classes in the 2020-2021 school year.

Academics
According to the 2020 U.S. News & World Report Best High School Rankings, FHS ranks 11th in Indiana and 805th among all high schools in the United States. Sixty-five percent of FHS students took one or more advanced placement exams, and 45 percent passed such an exam. Sixty-one percent of FHS students achieved math proficiency and seventy-eight percent achieved reading proficiency. In the College Readiness Index Rank, FHS is 1,248th out of 17,792 ranked high schools. For College Curriculum Breadth Index Rank it is ranked 1,236th, and 669th for Math and Reading Proficiency Rank. It's Math and Reading Performance Rank is 2,461. The FHS student-teacher ration is 23-1.

In the 2019-2020 school year, FHS had 10 National Merit Scholarship Finalists.

Athletics

Baseball (boys)
Basketball (boys & girls)
Cheerleading
Cross country (boys & girls)
2007 Boys state champion
Football (boys)
2010 State champion
Golf (boys & girls)
Lacrosse (boys & girls)
Soccer (boys & girls)
Girls 2014 State champion
Softball (girls)
Swimming (boys & girls)
Tennis (boys & girls)
Track and Field (boys & girls)
Volleyball (girls & boys)
Wrestling (boys)

Performing arts
FHS has two competitive show choirs, the mixed-gender "Electrum" and the women's-only "Sound". 

Electrum performs both concert and show choir literature. Formed in 2017, they compete both at show choir competitions throughout the state and at ISSMA State Contests. In 2019, Electrum received 5th in State honors at the ISSMA Show Choir State Finals. Other show choir and concert choir accomplishments include: Best vocal performance, best visual performance, four-time Tier 2 Grand Champion (2018, 2019), four-time ISSMA State Finalist for Concert Choir (2012, 2015, 2017) and in 2019 placed 6th in State. In 2020, Electrum earned Tier 1 Grand Championship at Center Grove Best of the Midwest as well as capturing Best Vocals, Best Choreography, Best General Effect Overall, and Best Costumes Overall at the competition.   

Sound is an advanced treble choir. They perform both concert and show choir literature and consist of 59 students ranging from freshmen to seniors. They compete both at show choir competitions and ISSMA State Contests, earning a spot in the State Show Choir Finals twice in their 14-year history. In 2019, Sound achieved 5th in State honors at the ISSMA Show Choir Finals! Other show choir invitational achievements include: Best Vocals, Best Visuals, People’s Choice and Grand Champion. In April of 2020, Sound was featured in Productions Magazine. In 2021, Sound earned two more Tier 1 Grand Championships at Center Grove Best of the Midwest and the Avon Vocal Invitational. Sound was undefeated during the 2021 season in the Best Visuals caption, capturing that award at all three competitions. Sound received the Best Vocals caption at the Avon Vocal Invitational. Sound also captured the Best Overall Effect Award at the Center Grove Best of the Midwest Competition.    

The school also hosts its own show choir competition, the Fishers Silver Spotlight Invitational.  The event has been held yearly since 2011.

Notable alumni
Jeremy Chinn, football player

See also
 List of high schools in Indiana

References

External links
 
 

Public high schools in Indiana
Schools in Hamilton County, Indiana
2006 establishments in Indiana
Educational institutions established in 2006